Edna de Lima (born Edna Burton; c. after 1875 – died after 1959), later known as Edna Burton Van Dyke, was an American lyric soprano singer and translator.

Early life
Edna O. Burton was from Lima, Ohio, the daughter of Dr. Enos G. Burton and Emma Jane Brown Burton. She took her professional name from her hometown. She studied voice in Paris with Marcella Sembrich and Jean de Reszke.

Career

Abroad
In 1910, Edna de Lima appeared in the operas Louise, Gli Ugonotti, Faust and La bohème at the Royal Opera House in Covent Garden in London.  Edna de Lima debuted at the Imperial Opera House in Vienna in 1914. She sang a role in Faust again in London in 1923. In 1925, she traveled to South Africa for a performing tour.

In the United States
Edna de Lima first sang at New York's Aeolian Hall in 1916. She made her Chicago concert debut in 1917, when a reviewer declared that "Nature has been bounteous to Mme. de Lima in the bestowal of personal attractiveness and grace of manner in addition to the crystalline purity of her voice." She was billed as "formerly of the Vienna Opera" when she appeared at the Stadium Concerts in New York in the summer of 1918. She performed on a bill with pianist Winifred Byrd, tenor Dan Beddoe, and violinist Michel Gusikoff, for the Globe Music Club later in 1918. She translated lyrics for recitalists, including Margaret Matzenauer. During World War I, she sang at concerts for the Liberty Bond Campaign, and for the Red Cross.

Personal life
Edna Burton married John Wesley Van Dyke, an oil company executive, in Paris in 1908, on the condition that she be allowed to continue her singing career, because "the divine fire of music was in her blood and in her brain". She was not mentioned in Van Dyke's obituary in 1939. However, "Mrs. Edna Van Dyke" was mentioned as still alive and living in New York City in her sister Elma Burton Baxter's obituary in 1960.

References

American opera singers
American women in World War I
People from Lima, Ohio
19th-century births
20th-century deaths
Year of birth uncertain
Year of death uncertain
20th-century American people
Singers from Ohio
Classical musicians from Ohio